There Was a Crooked Man is a 1960 British comedy film directed by Stuart Burge and starring Norman Wisdom, Alfred Marks, Andrew Cruickshank, Reginald Beckwith, and Susannah York. It is based on the James Bridie play The Golden Legend of Schults, and was one of two films Wisdom made independently to extend his range, (the other being The Girl on the Boat); although according to the BFI Screenonline website, "the cinema public craved only the Gump". The film was on general release in 1960 on the Rank circuit (supported by the documentary Jungle Hell) to less than spectacular business before being withdrawn, allegedly after American objections to Wisdom masquerading as an arrogant US general requisitioning British land for the US Air Force. The subject of US forces on British soil was deemed too sensitive even for comic treatment.

Premise
A naive explosives expert is tricked into working for a criminal gang. The title is taken from the poem "There Was a Crooked Man".

Cast
 Norman Wisdom as Davy Cooper  
 Alfred Marks as Adolf Carter  
 Andrew Cruickshank as McKillup  
 Reginald Beckwith as Station Master  
 Susannah York as Ellen  
 Jean Clarke as Freda  
 Timothy Bateson as Flash Dan  
 Paul Whitsun-Jones as Restaurant Gentleman  
 Fred Griffiths as Taxi Driver  
 Ann Hefferman as Hospital Sister  
 Rosalind Knight as Nurse  
 Reed De Rouen as Dutchman  
 Brian Oulton as Ashton  
 Glyn Houston as Smoking Machinist  
 Percy Herbert as Prison Warden
 Edna Petrie as Woman at Assembly Hall 
 Jack May as Police Sergeant 
 Ronald Fraser as General Cummins 
 Ed Devereaux as American Colonel 
 Sam Kydd as Foreman 
 Redmond Phillips as Padre
 George Murcell as Receptionist at 'The McKillup Arms'

Box Office
Kine Weekly called it a "money maker" at the British box office in 1960.

Release and home media 
The film was commercially unavailable for many years.  It had one television screening on ITV, on Boxing Day 1965. Author and Wisdom biographer Richard Dacre wrote in the booklet notes that accompanied the DVD release that he, Wisdom, and Director Stuart Burge were present when the Barbican Centre Cinema, London, presented its next known public screening at a 'Wisdom Weekend', in 1998. Ten years later, 2008, it was shown in Darwen, Lancashire, where location shots had been filmed in 1960.  (However, the 'First Day at Work' scenes were filmed at the "Early's of Witney" blanket factory, in Witney, Oxfordshire.)

The film was released on DVD on 8 May 2017.

References

External links
 
 
 

1960 films
1960s crime comedy films
British crime comedy films
British films based on plays
Films shot at Pinewood Studios
Films directed by Stuart Burge
1960 comedy films
1960s English-language films
1960s British films